Tetragraptidae is an extinct family of graptolites from the Floian to Darriwilian epochs of the Ordovician Period.

Genera
List of genera from Maletz (2014):

†Corymbograptus Obut & Sobolevskaya, 1964
†Paratetragraptus Obut, 1957
†Pendeograptus Bouček & Přibyl, 1951
†Phyllograptus Hall, 1858
†Pseudophyllograptus Cooper & Fortey, 1982
†Pseudotrigonograptus Mu & Lee, 1958
†Tetragraptus Salter, 1863
†Tristichograptus Jackson & Bulman, 1970

References

Graptolites
Prehistoric hemichordate families